Barakuh may refer to:
 Barakuh, Khvaf, Razavi Khorasan Province
 Barakuh, Rashtkhvar, Razavi Khorasan Province
 Barakuh Rural District, in South Khorasan Province